Maria Komnene (19 September 1085 – after 1136) was the second daughter of the Byzantine emperor Alexios I Komnenos. She was initially betrothed to Gregory Gabras, but married to Nikephoros Katakalon.

Life
Maria Komnene was born on Friday, 19 September 1085, as the second daughter and second child of the Byzantine emperor Alexios I Komnenos and Empress Irene Doukaina. As the daughter of a reigning emperor, she bore the title of porphyrogennete ("purpleborn").

In 1094 she was betrothed to  Gregory Gabras, the son of the doux of Chaldia Theodore Gabras. After Gregory tried to escape the palace and flee to his father, he was placed under arrest, and the betrothal was annulled.

Eventually, in  Maria married Nikephoros Katakalon, the son of Constantine Euphorbenos Katakalon, one of Alexios' most prominent and trusted generals. On the occasion, Nikephoros Katakalon was given the title of panhypersebastos. Along with her mother and her sisters, Maria attended her dying father in 1118.

Her husband also died young, sometime between 1118 and 1130. Maria and Nikephoros had a number of children, but only two sons, Alexios Komnenos and Andronikos, are known by name, having held senior positions later in the century. Another son, John, is known only by his commemoration in the typikon of the Monastery of Christ Philanthropos. 

The couple also had an unknown number of daughters (at least three according to Varzos), as their existence is mentioned in the typikon of the Kecharitomene Monastery. This convent was founded by Irene Doukaina, who had originally decreed that her younger daughter Eudokia should succeed her as patroness; after Eudokia died, Irene chose her oldest daughter, the scholar, physician, hospital administrator, and historian Anna Komnene instead, with Maria after her. The date of Maria's death is unknown, except that it occurred after 1136, when the deceased members of the imperial family were listed in the typikon of the Pantokrator Monastery.

In her Alexiad, her older sister Anna Komnene speaks with great affection and praise for her virtue, especially for her actions during their father's final days.

References

Sources
 
 
 
 

1085 births
12th-century deaths
Daughters of Byzantine emperors
11th-century Byzantine women
12th-century Byzantine women
Year of death unknown
Maria
Porphyrogennetoi